Pekka Heinonen (born 19 June 1940) is a Finnish diver. He competed in the men's 10 metre platform event at the 1960 Summer Olympics.

References

External links
 

1940 births
Living people
Finnish male divers
Olympic divers of Finland
Divers at the 1960 Summer Olympics
Divers from Helsinki